The Holstein Tower is a  high gyro tower that serves as a landmark for the Bay of Lübeck and Neustadt. It is located at Hansa Park in Sierksdorf, Schleswig-Holstein, Germany and was built in 1988, opposite many other similar structures additionally guyed at the machine unit.

Technical information 
The glazed gondola rotates clockwise at a speed of approx.  to a height of approx. , so that you have a view over the entire Bay of Neustadt and, in good weather, even as far as Lübeck.

The gondola can accommodate up to 72 guests. The ride has an hourly capacity of around 900 people.

Particularities 
The entire tower resembles a traditional ship's mast. On the machine house at the top of the tower there is a large flagpole with the flag of Schleswig-Holstein in a size of approx. , which is however retracted in the visible protective cover during the closed winter season and in bad weather. For technical reasons, the passenger gondola remains positioned at the highest point during the closed winter season, and overnight in the middle of the tower during the open season.

The Holstein Tower was the highest attraction in Hansa Park from its opening until the 2019 season, but was then replaced by the Highlander gyro drop tower with a total height of 120 meters.

References

External links
 Official website of Hansa Park

See also
 List of towers

Towers in Germany
1988 establishments in West Germany